Kozai Dam is an arch dam located in Tokushima prefecture in Japan. The dam is used for flood control and irrigation. The catchment area of the dam is 0.1 km2. The dam impounds about 1  ha of land when full and can store 21 thousand cubic meters of water. The construction of the dam was completed in 1954.

References

Dams in Tokushima Prefecture
1954 establishments in Japan